Bushra al-Assad (born 24 October 1960) is the first child and only daughter of Hafez al-Assad, who was the president of Syria from 1971 to 2000. She is the sister of current Syrian President Bashar al-Assad. She is the widow of Assef Shawkat, the deputy chief of staff of the Syrian Armed Forces and former head of the Syrian Military Intelligence, who was killed in an explosion on 18 July 2012.

As a result of the Syrian Civil War, in March 2012 she was placed on a list of Syrian government figures who were subject to European Union economic sanctions and travel bans. On 28 September 2012, it was reported that Bushra al-Assad had fled from Syria with her five children to seek refuge in the United Arab Emirates. In January 2013, Bushra al-Assad was joined by her mother Anisa Makhlouf in Dubai.

Biography
Bushra is reported to have enjoyed a close relationship with her father Hafez al-Assad and reportedly took a large role in leadership during the last years of his life, particularly as Hafez's health started failing during the 90's and all of his administrative tasks and even much of the important decision making was being delegated to Bushra, who set up her own office next to her father in the Presidential Palace. During the late 70s, she even accompanied her father during foreign visits and was very active in the decision-making within her father's inner circle, especially in matters relating to economic and foreign affairs, leading to speculation that she was being considered for a leadership role and even possible succession. Despite this, by the 1980s, her younger brother Bassel took on that role instead and after 1994, her second oldest brother, Bashar. In both cases, she mounted her own attempt at fighting for the succession, especially after Bashar's selection, believing him to be incapable for the role. There has been widespread speculation that had it not been for her gender, she would have been groomed for the presidency. It is reported that she helped convince her father that jailing her uncle, Rifaat al-Assad, after his failed 1984 coup attempt would disgrace the family.

Bushra received her degree in pharmacy in 1982 from Damascus University. At university Bushra befriended Bouthaina Shaaban who is now member of the Syrian Cabinet. Some sources report Shaaban introduced Bushra to Shawkat, an army officer 10 years her senior and reportedly married with a reputation for womanizing. Despite family opposition, Bushra married Shawkat in 1995.

Since the death of her brother Bassel al-Assad in 1994, Bushra was credited with increasing influence in Syria. She was reported to have played a major role in guiding the development of Syria's pharmaceutical industry. Bushra was also reported to have worked for her late husband to gain acceptance and recognition. In the late 1990s, Shawkat assumed key security roles within Syria's military and intelligence apparatus.

Tensions between Bushra and her sister-in-law Syria's first lady Asma al-Assad were reported. Since Asma's marriage to the Syrian president in 2000, Asma defied social conventions by frequently appearing in public and in the media. It was reported that Bushra disapproved of Asma taking such a public role.

Bushra moved to the United Arab Emirates in September 2012 following her husband's death in a bomb blast. Although rebels claimed responsibility, there was some suspicion the regime of her brother may have played a role. Bushra is living in Dubai with her five children.

Her daughter, Anisa, was studying spatial design at the University of the Arts London, despite being a member of family subject to international sanctions. Later, the National Crime Agency seized the remaining £25k in her bank account.

See also
Assad family

Bibliography

References

External links

1960 births
Living people
Damascus University alumni
Syrian Muslims
People from Latakia
Bushra Al-Assad
Syrian Alawites
Daughters of national leaders